The Bitch Wars, or Suka Wars, occurred in the Soviet Gulag labor-camp system between 1945 and 1953, around the time of Joseph Stalin's death. In this conflict rival sides were often identified by the system of tattoos common in Soviet prisons at the time.

Background
The Russian word suka (literally "bitch") has a different negative connotation than its English equivalent. In Russian criminal argot, it specifically refers to a person from the criminal world who has "made oneself a bitch" by cooperating in any way with law enforcement or with the government. Within the Soviet prison system, a social structure had existed since the Russian Tsarist era; one of its most important tenets decreed that members not serve or collaborate with the Tsarist (and later, Soviet) government. This rule encompassed all types of collaboration and not just "snitching" or "ratting out".

Second World War
As the Second World War progressed, Joseph Stalin offered many prisoners a pardon or sentence reduction at war's end in exchange for military service. After the war ended, many of those who had taken up the offer returned to prisons and labor camps, but were declared suki and placed at the lower end of the unofficial prisoner hierarchy. As a result, they sought to survive by collaborating with prison officials, in return getting some of the better jobs in the prison.

This led to an internal prison war between the so-called suki and the Russian criminal underground, called "Thieves in Law". Many prisoners died in the Bitch War, but prison authorities turned a blind eye since prisoner deaths reduced the overall prison population.

See also
Gulag
Prison gang
Russian mafia
Soviet Union in World War II

References

Further reading
Александр Сидоров (2005) "Воры против сук. Подлинная история воровского братства, 1941-1991",

External links
Anton Antonov-Ovseenko, Enemy of the people, Moscow. Intellekt, 1996, "Bitch War" Section, text online at the Sakharov Center website

1940s in the Soviet Union
1950s in the Soviet Union
Crime in the Soviet Union
Soviet phraseology
Russian Mafia events
Organized crime conflicts
Gulag